Anthopotamus neglectus is a species of hacklegilled burrower mayfly in the family Potamanthidae. It is found in southeastern Canada and the northeastern United States.

Subspecies
 Anthopotamus neglectus disjunctus Bae and McCafferty, 1991
 Anthopotamus neglectus neglectus (Traver, 1935)

References

Further reading

 

mayflies
Insects described in 1935